Talabani is a surname. It may refer to:

Kadir Talabani (born 1986), Iraqi born Norwegian Kurdish actor. 
Jalal Talabani (1933–2017), sixth President of Iraq from 2005 to 2014, 39th Prime Minister of Iraq, leader of the Iraqi Kurdish Patriotic Union of Kurdistan.
Héro Talabani, or Hero Ibrahim Ahmed, Kurdish political figure, spouse of Jalal Talabani. 
Bafel Talabani, Iraqi Kurdish politician, Co-President of the Patriotic Union of Kurdistan since 2020. Older son of Jalal Talabani. 
Qubad Talabani (born 1977), Iraqi Kurdish politician, deputy prime minister of the Kurdistan Regional Government since 2005. Son of Jalal Talabani.
Lahur Talabany (born 1976), Iraqi Kurdish politician, Co-President of the Patriotic Union of Kurdistan since 2020. Nephew of Jalal Talabani.
Mukarram Talabani (born 1925), Iraqi Kurdish politician and government minister.
Sheikh Riza Talabani (1835–1910), celebrated Kurdish poet from Kirkuk, Iraq, writing poetry in Kurdish, Turkish, Persian and Arabic.